Jawasiya-Arni is an archaeological site located in the Mewar Plains, in South Rajasthan, India. It is located within the Rajsamand, Arni, and Chittorgarh districts.

Archaeology 
The Jawasiya-Arnia site is located in the Mewar Plains. The site was excavated in 2014. Evidence of copper artifacts, places the site within the Chalcolithic period. Other major findings include Black-and-Red ware, distinct of Chalcolithic era South Asia.

References 

Archaeological sites in Rajasthan
Chalcolithic sites of Asia